Beep the Meep is a fictional alien appearing in various material from the long-running British science fiction television series Doctor Who. Beep originated as a comic strip character in the pages of Doctor Who Magazine, and later appeared in audio dramas produced by Big Finish Productions. The cute and cuddly appearance of Beep the Meep — a round, furry biped with large, expressive eyes and long ears — belies his true nature as a malevolent, homicidal would-be conqueror and dictator.

The character will make his first appearance in live-action in the show's upcoming 60th anniversary specials in 2023.

Overview
Beep first appeared in the 1980 comic strip Doctor Who and the Star Beast, written by Pat Mills and John Wagner and drawn by Dave Gibbons, which ran in issues #19-#26 of Doctor Who Weekly. In the story, Beep is the leader of the Meeps, an advanced and peaceful race who lived in harmony and happiness until radiation from their planet's orbit passing by a Black Sun mutated them into an aggressive, expansionist species who began to mercilessly conquer and subjugate other planets. After the Wrarth Warriors, a genetically engineered insectoid race acting as interstellar law enforcers, destroyed the Meep armada, Beep's ship fled and was shot down over Earth where it crash landed in the English city of Blackcastle. Beep sought refuge with two schoolchildren, using his fuzzy appearance to masquerade as a hapless, harmless creature being hunted by the ruthless Wrarth. It was in this guise that he encountered the Fourth Doctor, who protected him from the Wrarth until Beep's true nature was revealed to him. Beep used hypnosis to coerce humans to help repair his spaceship, deciding to take off in a hyper-space jump, even though this would destroy Blackpool. However, the Doctor then aided the Wrarth in apprehending Beep, and he was taken away to face justice. One of the schoolchildren who found Beep, Sharon Davies, would join the Fourth Doctor as a companion in the comic strip.

After a cameo appearance in Doctor Who Magazine #173's Party Animals (1991), Beep reappeared as a villain fifteen years later in The Star Beast II (published in the 1996 Doctor Who Magazine Yearbook) where he was released on parole and sought revenge, but the Fourth Doctor used black star energy to trap him inside the children's movie For the Love of Lassie. In Doctor Who Magazine #283's TV Action! (1999), Beep travelled to the 1979 of a parallel world where the Doctor was the subject of a television programme titled Doctor Who. Beep tried to take over the BBC Television Centre, planning to broadcast black star radiation into households across Britain in an attempt to turn everyone as evil as himself. However, he mistook the actor Tom Baker for his hated nemesis and, while distracted, was defeated by the Eighth Doctor, his companion Izzy and many other television personalities. A hallucinatory Beep appeared in the Eighth Doctor strip A Life of Matter and Death (DWM #250).

Beep left the realm of the comic strip in an audio play produced by Big Finish Productions, The Ratings War, which was on a promotional CD given away with DWM #313. In the play, Toby Longworth provided the voice for Beep, who went up against the Sixth Doctor, voiced by Colin Baker. There, Beep tried much the same ploy as he did in TV Action!, except this time he produced a children's programme called Beep and Friends to effect a conquest by guile rather than by force. He was once again defeated by the Doctor and handed back to the Wrarth.

In March 2019, Big Finish released The Comic Strip Adaptations Volume 1 audio book, one of the stories being Doctor Who and the Star Beast. Beep is voiced by Bethan Dixon Bate.

In December 2022, it was revealed that the 60th anniversary specials to air in 2023 would feature Beep and Wrarth Warriors.

List of appearances

Comics
Doctor Who and the Star Beast (Doctor Who Weekly #19-#26)
Party Animals (Doctor Who Magazine #173)
The Star Beast II (Doctor Who Magazine Yearbook: 1996)
TV Action! (Doctor Who Magazine #283)

Audio plays
The Ratings War
The Comic Strip Adaptations Volume 1 (adaptation of The Star Beast)

Television
Doctor Who (2023 specials) (upcoming)

References

Comics characters introduced in 1980
Doctor Who aliens
Doctor Who audio characters
Doctor Who comic strip characters
Fictional dictators